The Anglo Australian Planet Search or (AAPS) is a long-term astronomical survey started in 1998 and continuing to the present. It is being carried out on the 3.9-metre Anglo-Australian Telescope (AAT) of the Anglo-Australian Observatory in Australia. The purpose of this survey is to catalog planets around more than 240 nearby stars of the southern hemisphere. For its observations, the AAT uses the University College London Echelle Spectrograph, UCLES, an echelle spectrograph from the University College London located at the telescope's coudé focus. This survey uses the radial velocity method to search for extrasolar planets.

The survey eventually switched its main focus to detecting long-period Jupiter analogs.

Planets discovered by AAPS
This survey has announced the discovery of 28 planetary objects as of February 2014, including three multi-planet systems.

See also
 High Accuracy Radial Velocity Planet Searcher is another planet detector in the southern hemisphere.
 Lists of exoplanets

References

External links
 Anglo-Australian Planet Search Home Page

Astronomical surveys
Exoplanet search projects